Fernando González was the defending champion but did not compete that year.

David Sánchez won in the final 1–6, 6–3, 6–3 against Marcelo Ríos.

Seeds

  Gastón Gaudio (semifinals)
  Nicolás Lapentti (withdrew because of a back injury)
  Marcelo Ríos (final)
  José Acasuso (second round)
  Agustín Calleri (quarterfinals)
  Fernando Vicente (second round)
  Félix Mantilla (quarterfinals)
  David Ferrer (second round)

Draw

Finals

Top half

Bottom half

External links
 Singles draw

Chile Open (tennis)
2003 ATP Tour